Steven "Steve" Sydness (born c. 1956. died April 16, 2014) was an American politician and businessman. He was the Republican Party nominee for one of North Dakota's open United States Senate seats in the 1992 election, and was the former CEO of the Endurance International Group in Massachusetts. Before running for The US Senate, he had helped found Great Plains Software in North Dakota, and had served as city commissioner of Fargo. He was a graduate of Principia College in Elsah, IL and Harvard Business School in Cambridge, MA where he received his MBA in 1981.

References

External links
 Steve Sydness at Endurance International
 

1950s births
North Dakota Republicans
Principia College alumni
Harvard Business School alumni
American chief executives
Living people